Oltipraz is an organosulfur compound belonging to the dithiolethione class. It acts as a schistosomicide and has been shown in rodent models to inhibit the formation of cancers in the bladder, blood, colon, kidney, liver, lung, pancreas, stomach, and trachea, skin, and mammary tissue. Clinical trials of oltipraz have failed to demonstrate efficacy and have shown significant side effects, including neurotoxicity and gastrointestinal toxicity. Oltipraz has also been shown to generate superoxide radical, which can be toxic.

References

Antiparasitic agents
Pyrazines
Dithioles
Thiocarbonyl compounds
Antineoplastic drugs